1987 Fatehabad bus killings was a massacre of Hindu bus-passengers by Sikh terrorists. It occurred on 7 July 1987 near Fatehabad, in the northern state of Haryana, India.

The militants attacked two buses and killed 34 bus passengers. The militants created roadblock by using a car and a Jeep. They singled out Hindu passengers and dragged them off to shot them to death. The Khalistan Commando Force claimed responsibility for the attacks.

References

See also 
1991 Punjab killings
Punjab

Massacres in 1987
Mass shootings in India
Insurgency in Punjab
Fatehabad bus massacre, 1987
Terrorism in Punjab, India
Fatehabad bus massacre, 1987
Terrorist incidents on buses in Asia
Sikh terrorism in India
Khalistan movement
1987 mass shootings in Asia
1987 murders in India